Community Memorial Hospital is a historic hospital building at 15 Winthrop Avenue in Ayer, Massachusetts.  The brick and stone Colonial Revival building was constructed in 1929, and expanded in the 1950s.  It was designed by the Fitchburg architectural firm of Haynes & Mason, and was the first hospital building dedicated to serving the town of Ayer.  The organization that operated the hospital was created by the merger of the Ayer Hospital Association, founded in 1912, and the Ayer Private Hospital, founded 1924.  This organization operated the facility until 1957, when it was merged with the Groton Community Hospital.  This group continued to operate the facility until 1971, when it moved to new premises and vacated this building.

The building was listed on the National Register of Historic Places in 2004.  The building is currently (2018) being operated as Nashoba Valley Assisted Living.

See also
National Register of Historic Places listings in Middlesex County, Massachusetts

References

Hospital buildings completed in 1929
Hospitals in Middlesex County, Massachusetts
Hospital buildings on the National Register of Historic Places in Massachusetts
National Register of Historic Places in Middlesex County, Massachusetts